Mitieli Vulikijapani (born 27 June 1994) is a Fijian professional rugby league footballer who plays as a er for Hull FC in the Betfred Super League and Fiji at international level.

He spent time on loan from Hull at the Bradford Bulls in the Betfred Championship.

Playing career
In 2021, he made his FC début in the Super League against Leigh.

In round 15 of the 2021 Super League season, he scored two tries for Hull F.C. in a 40-26 loss against Huddersfield.

References

External links
Hull FC profile
SL profile
Fiji profile

1994 births
Living people
Bradford Bulls players
Fiji national rugby league team players
Fijian rugby league players
Hull F.C. players
Rugby league wingers